The 1970–71 Athenian League season was the 48th in the history of Athenian League. The league consisted of 48 teams.

Premier Division

The division featured two new teams, both promoted from last season's Division One:
 Lewes  (1st)
 Boreham Wood (2nd)

League table

Division One

The division featured 4 new teams:
 2 relegated from last season's Premier Division:
 Finchley (15th)
 Eastbourne United  (16th)
 2 promoted from last season's Division Two:
 Horsham (1st)
 Edmonton (2nd)

League table

Division Two

The division featured 2 new teams, all relegated from last season's Division One:
 Ware (15th)
 Croydon Amateurs (16th)

League table

References

1970–71 in English football leagues
Athenian League